In mathematics, and more specifically in polyhedral combinatorics, a Goldberg polyhedron is a convex polyhedron made from hexagons and pentagons. They were first described in 1937 by Michael Goldberg (1902–1990). They are defined by three properties: each face is either a pentagon or hexagon, exactly three faces meet at each vertex, and they have rotational icosahedral symmetry. A Goldberg polyhedron is a dual polyhedron of a geodesic sphere.

A consequence of Euler's polyhedron formula is that a Goldberg polyhedron always has exactly twelve pentagonal faces. Icosahedral symmetry ensures that the pentagons are always regular and that there are always 12 of them. If the vertices are not constrained to a sphere, the polyhedron can be constructed with planar equilateral (but not in general equiangular) faces.

Simple examples of Goldberg polyhedra include the dodecahedron and truncated icosahedron. Other forms can be described by taking a chess knight move from one pentagon to the next: first take  steps in one direction, then turn 60° to the left and take  steps.

A similar technique can be applied to construct polyhedra with tetrahedral symmetry and octahedral symmetry. These polyhedra will have triangles or squares rather than pentagons. These variations are given Roman numeral subscripts denoting the number of sides on the non-hexagon faces:   and

Elements 
The number of vertices, edges, and faces of GP(m,n) can be computed from m and n, with T = m2 + mn + n2 = (m + n)2 − mn, depending on one of three symmetry systems: 
The number of non-hexagonal faces can be determined using the Euler characteristic, as demonstrated here.

Construction 
Most Goldberg polyhedra can be constructed using Conway polyhedron notation starting with (T)etrahedron, (C)ube, and (D)odecahedron seeds. The chamfer operator, c, replaces all edges by hexagons, transforming GP(m,n) to GP(2m,2n), with a T multiplier of 4. The truncated kis operator, y = tk, generates GP(3,0), transforming GP(m,n) to GP(3m,3n), with a T multiplier of 9.

For class 2 forms, the dual kis operator, z = dk, transforms GP(a,0) into GP(a,a), with a T multiplier of 3. For class 3 forms, the whirl operator, w, generates GP(2,1), with a T multiplier of 7. A clockwise and counterclockwise whirl generator, w = wrw generates GP(7,0) in class 1. In general, a whirl can transform a GP(a,b) into GP(a + 3b,2ab) for a > b and the same chiral direction. If chiral directions are reversed, GP(a,b) becomes GP(2a + 3b,a − 2b) if a ≥ 2b, and GP(3a + b,2b − a) if a < 2b.

Examples

See also
Capsid
Geodesic sphere
Fullerene#Other buckyballs
Conway polyhedron notation
Goldberg–Coxeter construction

Notes

References

 Joseph D. Clinton, Clinton’s Equal Central Angle Conjecture

External links
 Dual Geodesic Icosahedra
 Goldberg variations: New shapes for molecular cages Flat hexagons and pentagons come together in new twist on old polyhedral, by Dana Mackenzie, February 14, 2014